Bergelmir is a jötunn in Norse mythology.

Name 
The Old Norse name Bergelmir has been variously translated as 'bear-yeller', 'mountain-yeller', or 'bare-yeller'. According to linguist Jan de Vries, the name should be read as ber-gelmir ('who roars like a bear') rather than berg-gelmir ('who roars in the mountains').

Attestations 
In Vafþrúðnismál (The Lay of Vafþrúðnir), Bergelmir is portrayed as the son of Þrúðgelmir and the grandson of the first  Aurgelmir (Ymir). When Odin asks Vafthrúdnir who is the oldest among the æsir and the jötnar, the wise  responds that:

In the same poem, Odin then asks Vafthrúdnir about the monstrous birth of the offspring of Aurgelmir, and Vafthrúdnir responds:

In Gylfaginning (The Beguiling of Gylfi), while the blood of Ymir (Aurgelmir) is flooding the earth after the sons of Borr (Odin, Vili, and Vé) have killed him, Bergelmir is likewise pictured as escaping on a lúðr with his wife to re-found the frost- race.

Based upon Snorri's account, the Old Norse word lúðr might have referred to a 'coffin', a 'cradle', a 'chest', or some wooden part of a mill.

Theories
Robert D. Fulk notes that Snorri's Prose Edda account "conflicts with the poetic version, as the [Prose Edda] presents a Noah-like figure, while the latter has Bergelmir laid (lagiðr) in the lúðr, implying he is an infant, as in the Scyld story. But Snorri does add the crucial element not made in the explicit verses, that the lúðr is to serve as a floating vessel."

Fulk continues that "the key word here is lúðr, which ought to refer to a flour-bin. To be precise, the object is a box or wooden trough, perhaps on legs, in which the stones of a hand-mill sit [...]. It is true that most glossators assume some meaning other than 'flour-bin' in Vafþrúðnismál and Snorra edda [an alternate name for the Prose Edda], suggesting instead something in the range of 'coffin (or cradle), chest, ark (i.e. boat)'." Fulk details that "the interpretation of 'ark' derives solely from the passage in Snorra Edda, because of Bergelmir's resemblance to Noah, and the fact that [Old Icelandic] ǫrk [...] can refer to both Noah's ark and a chest or a sarcophagus."

Notes

References

Jötnar
Flood myths
Ymir